The 1974 Memphis State Tigers football team represented Memphis State University (now known as the University of Memphis) as an independent during the 1974 NCAA Division I football season. In its third and final season under head coach Fred Pancoast, the team compiled an 7–4 record and outscored opponents by a total of 225 to 148. The team played its home games at Memphis Memorial Stadium in Memphis, Tennessee. 

The team's statistical leaders included David Fowler with 1,266 passing yards, Reuben Gibson with 493 rushing yards, James Thompson with 395 receiving yards, and James Thompson and Terdell Middleton with 30 points scored each.

Schedule

References

Memphis State
Memphis Tigers football seasons
Memphis State Tigers football